The enzyme hydroxymandelonitrile lyase catalyzes the chemical reaction

(S)-4-hydroxymandelonitrile  cyanide + 4-hydroxybenzaldehyde

This enzyme belongs to the family of lyases, specifically the aldehyde-lyases, which cleave carbon-carbon bonds.  The systematic name of this enzyme class is (S)-4-hydroxymandelonitrile 4-hydroxybenzaldehyde-lyase (cyanide-forming). Other names in common use include hydroxynitrile lyase, oxynitrilase, Sorghum hydroxynitrile lyase, and (S)-4-hydroxymandelonitrile hydroxybenzaldehyde-lyase.  This enzyme participates in cyanoamino acid metabolism.

Structural studies

As of late 2007, only one structure has been solved for this class of enzymes, with the PDB accession code .

References

 
 

EC 4.1.2
Enzymes of known structure